Kaliapara Ramkrishna Vidyabhaban is a higher, government-run secondary school founded in 1967 by Lt. Arun Chandra Jana. The school sits on the border of two villages, Binodpur and Kaliapara, in West Bengal, India. The school offers two streams higher secondary tracks, science and arts.  It is situated in Keshiary block in Kharagpur subdivision in Paschim Medinipur district.

Curriculum 
The school has grades 5 to 12 and the language of instruction is Bengali. Students appear for 10+(Madhyamik) examination under West Bengal Board of Secondary Education and 12+(Higher Secondary Examination) examination under West Bengal Council of Higher Secondary Education. Grade 11 and 12 have three streams- science, arts and commerce. 

The school uniform is white shirt and navy blue pant with black leather shoes. Students are bound to keep their School Identity Cards & School Badges. Minimum attendance of 75% through academic year maintained strictly.

Events

In addition to its annual celebration of Rabindra Jayanti (the birthday of Rabindranath Tagore), Kaliapara Ramkrishna Vidyabhaban, hosts several  events in campus, the most prominent of which is Rabindra Utsab. One of oldest school festivals, it is held annually in late July or early August. The fest initially began with just two events—“Pravat Feri” and “Samapti Sangeet”.

References

Boys' schools in India
High schools and secondary schools in West Bengal
Schools in Paschim Medinipur district
1967 establishments in West Bengal
Educational institutions established in 1967